{{Automatic taxobox
| taxon = Sedilia
| image = 
| image_caption = 
| authority = Fargo, 1953 
| synonyms_ref = 
| synonyms = 
| type_species= † Drillia sedilia Dall, 1890  
| subdivision_ranks = Species
| subdivision = See text
| display_parents = 3
}}Sedilia is a genus of sea snails, marine gastropod mollusks in the family Drilliidae.

Species
Species within the genus Sedilia include:
 † Sedilia aphanitoma Dall 1892
 Sedilia compacta Faber, 2011
 † Sedilia sedilia (Dall, 1890) 
Species brought into synonymy
 Sedilia melanacme (E. A. Smith, 1882): synonym of Buchema melanacme (E. A. Smith, 1882)

References

 Dall, William Healey. Contributions to the Tertiary fauna of Florida: with Especial Reference to the Miocene Silex-Beds of Tampa and the Pliocene Beds of the Caloosahatchie River. Vol. 3. Wagner Free Institute of Science, 1890.
 Dall, W. H. "Contributions to the Tertiary fauna of Florida, Part 3: Wagner Free Inst. Sci." Trans 3 (1892): 349-350.
 W. G. Fargo. 1953. Part 2. The Pliocene Turridae of Saint Petersburg, Florida''. Academy of Natural Sciences of Philadelphia Monograph 8:365-409

External links